Valley Hospital Medical Center is a for-profit hospital owned by Universal Health Services and operated by Valley Health System. It is one of six hospitals within the Valley Health System in Las Vegas, Nevada. It is accredited by the Joint Commission and includes a certified Primary Stroke Center, an accredited Chest Pain Center and a certified Heart Failure Center.

History
The hospital, founded in 1972, established Southern Nevada's first air ambulance service, Flight for Life, which was owned by Metro Aviation, in 1980. On December 4, 2001, Valley Hospital ended its contract with Metro Aviation, shutting down the Flight for Life air ambulance service and retiring the helipad. Valley Hospital completed a new helipad next to the emergency department with a grassy area in 2007.

Valley's Emergency Critical Care Center increased the number of beds from 28 to 42 on March 11, 2004. This project was completed when 11 urgent care beds were added to the center in June.

The hospital no longer has labor and delivery, NICU, nursery or gynecology units as of 2014. This area of the hospital was re-purposed to become a Behavioral Health Unit.

Services
 Chest Pain Center
 Behavior Health Unit
 Medical/Surgical floors (with telemetry)
 Critical Care
 Stroke Center
 Emergency Department
 Surgical and Endoscopic Care (and recovery unit)
 Acute Rehabilitation
 Diabetes Education and Counseling

Advanced Cardiovascular Service
 Open heart surgery
 Balloon angioplasty
 Cardiac catheterizations and stenting
 Peripheral vascular studies

Neurological Services
 Coiling for brain aneurysms
 Neurosurgery
 Stroke care

Helipad

From 1980 to 2001, the helipad was located on top of the hospital, adjacent to the lobby. After "Flight for Life" was sold to "Mercy Air Services" in 2001, the hospital created a landing zone just south of the emergency entrance in a dirt lot for Mercy Air's bigger helicopters. In 2007, the hospital refurbished an old parking lot into a grassy area, complete with a new helipad right in front of the emergency entrance.

References

External links
 

1972 establishments in Nevada
Hospital buildings completed in 1972
Hospitals established in 1972
Hospitals in Las Vegas
Teaching hospitals in Nevada